Elssler or Elßler is a surname. Notable people with the surname include:

 Fanny Elssler (1810–1884), Austrian ballet dancer, sister of Therese Elssler
 Therese Elssler (1808–1878), Austrian ballet dancer

See also
Ellsler

German-language surnames